Matthews Point is a point forming the west side of the entrance to Undine Harbour, along the south coast and near the west end of South Georgia. It was charted between 1926 and 1930 by Discovery Investigations (DI) personnel and named for British zoologist L. Harrison Matthews, a member of the staff of the DI from 1924 to 1935, who worked at South Georgia from 1924 to 1927.

References

Headlands of South Georgia